Momiji manjū is a type of manjū and Imagawayaki. The confection is a buckwheat and rice cake shaped like a Japanese maple leaf, and is a local specialty on the island of Itsukushima (Miyajima) in Hiroshima. It is typically filled with red bean paste.

Overview 
Momiji manjū is a local specialty and souvenir in Itsukushima, Three views of Japan. Today, Momiji manjū is known not only for Miyajima's souvenirs but also Hiroshima Prefecture’s miyagegashi nationwide.

Momiji manjū was invented by a Wagashi craftsman in the late Meiji period.

See also

 List of Japanese desserts and sweets
 Miyagegashi
 Meibutsu
 Tokusanhin

References

Japanese desserts and sweets